Thiruvalluvar Government Higher Secondary School is a vocational secondary school in [[Periyayee Palayam|, Tiruppur district district, in the Indian state of Tamil Nadu. According to the Government of Tamil Nadu Directorate of School Education, the school has one teacher.

References

Founder– 12th student c2 class in 2018-2019 batch 

High schools and secondary schools in Tamil Nadu
Tiruppur district